Renate Krößner also known as Renate Krössner (17 May 194525 May 2020) was a German actress who was internationally recognized for roles in films and television. She was awarded the Silver Bear for Best Actress of the Berlinale for the title role in the 1980 film Solo Sunny. From 1985, she worked in West Berlin and was known for roles in TV series such as Tatort and Einmal Bulle, immer Bulle.

Early life and education 
Krößner was born in Osterode am Harz, the daughter of a teacher. She grew up in Berlin and appeared in school theatre productions. She was trained at the Staatliche Schauspielschule, earning her diploma at age 19, and then worked at several provincial theatres in the East Germany.

Career 

Krößner appeared in the title role of the DEFA film Solo Sunny in 1980, written by Wolfgang Kohlhaase and directed by Konrad Wolf, and remained identified with this role of a young woman from Prenzlauer Berg, a factory worker who dreams of artistic freedom as a singer, touring with a mediocre band, and in conflict with social conventions of the period. For her character role, she was awarded the Silver Bear for Best Actress at the 30th Berlin International Film Festival. It was the first Berlinale award for an East German production.

In 1985, Krößner and her husband, the actor , moved to West Berlin where she played on stage, with guest performances. (2004). In 1993, she won a Deutscher Filmpreis Best Actress award for her work in North Curve.

In 1991, Krößner was a member of the jury at the 41st Berlin International Film Festival.

Death 
On 25 May 2020, Krößner died after a short illness at the age of 75.

References

External links
 
 

1945 births
2020 deaths
People from Osterode am Harz
German film actresses
Ernst Busch Academy of Dramatic Arts alumni
Silver Bear for Best Actress winners
Best Actress German Film Award winners
German television actresses
20th-century German actresses
21st-century German actresses